Adecco Staffing, USA is the second largest provider of recruitment and staffing services in the United States, offering human resource services such as temporary staffing, permanent placement, outsourcing, career transition or outplacement. Based in Jacksonville, FL, it serves small- and mid-sized businesses as well as Fortune 500 companies.

Adecco Staffing is a subsidiary of Adecco Group North America, which is owned by the Swiss-based Adecco Group. In 2016, Adecco Group was 442 in the Fortune Global 500.

History 
 1996, Staffing service firms Adia and ECCO merge to become Adecco.
 2000, Adecco Group acquires Melville, NY-based Olsten’s general staffing and information technology business for $1.5 billion.
 2009, Adecco made a bid worth $1.17 billion to buy Florida-based MPS Group 
 2014, Adecco Staffing, along with Adecco Group NA, moves its headquarters to Jacksonville, FL, following the October 20, 2009, Adecco Group acquisition of Jacksonville, FL-based MPS Group, Inc.

Services 

Adecco Staffing, USA specializes in temporary staffing, permanent job placement, outsourcing, temp-to-hire, recruiting, career transition (outplacement) services, vendor management services and payroll services.

References 

Employment agencies of the United States